Dinteville is a commune in the Haute-Marne department in north-eastern France.

The Chateau de Dinteville used to be a residence of the Marquesses of Rougé.

See also
Communes of the Haute-Marne department

References

Communes of Haute-Marne